The 1999 Nigerian Senate election in Anambra State was held on February 20, 1999, to elect members of the Nigerian Senate to represent Anambra State. Nnamdi Eriobuna representing Anambra South, Chuba Okadigbo representing Anambra North and Michael Ajegbo representing Anambra Central all won on the platform of the Peoples Democratic Party.

Overview

Summary

Results

Anambra South 
The election was won by Nnamdi Eriobuna of the Peoples Democratic Party.

Anambra North 
The election was won by Chuba Okadigbo of the Peoples Democratic Party.

Anambra Central 
The election was won by Michael Ajegbo of the Peoples Democratic Party.

References 

Ana
Anambra State Senate elections
February 1999 events in Nigeria